Hey! Pikmin is an action game in the Pikmin series developed by Arzest and published by Nintendo for the Nintendo 3DS handheld video game console. It is a standalone sequel to Pikmin 3 and is the series' first installment on a handheld console. Hey! Pikmin was released worldwide in July 2017, coinciding with the release of the New Nintendo 2DS XL – the fifth and final hardware revision of the 3DS. It received generally mixed reviews from critics.

Gameplay 
Hey! Pikmin consists of main character Captain Olimar leading a group of Pikmin through 2D levels while collecting items that contain "sparklium", the main source of fuel for Olimar's ship. Unlike other games of the Pikmin series, players do not choose what Pikmin to bring into levels. Instead, players enter a level and use whatever Pikmin they find while exploring. Olimar is able to swim and use a jetpack to reach new areas. Winged Pikmin are able to carry Olimar while flying. Olimar is incapable of attacking on his own, instead relying on the Pikmin for defense. As players continue to collect more sparklium, Olimar is able to upgrade his space suit's capabilities such as the amount of fuel the jetpack has or the amount of hits it can take.

After clearing a level, all recruited Pikmin are taken to the Pikmin Park, an area where Pikmin can be sent to look for more objects with sparklium. By finding colored pellets, the amount of Pikmin in the park can be increased. After clearing a section of the Pikmin Park, more sections open up for the Pikmin to explore. The game is compatible with every Amiibo released before the game's launch, which provide a variety of in-game bonuses. A Pikmin-themed Amiibo was also released at launch.

Plot 
Olimar is flying in space on his new ship, the S.S. Dolphin II, when he hits an asteroid and crash-lands on an unknown planet. He learns that in order to bring his ship back in working order, he must collect 30,000 of the substance known as Sparklium. He soon re-encounters Red Pikmin, which he figures out he can use to carry Sparklium-rich treasures and acorn-like seeds. These "treasures" are usually common household objects, such as glasses or toothpaste. As Olimar searches more sectors of the planet, he finds Yellow Pikmin, Blue Pikmin, Rock Pikmin, and Winged Pikmin in that order. Once the player gathers up 30,000 Sparklium, Olimar learns he must retrieve an essential component needed to repair the ship, the Sparklium Converter. However, it is revealed that it was eaten by the Berserk Leech Hydroe, a giant plant-like boss which he must fight. After defeating it and obtaining the converter, Olimar heads back to his home planet, Hocotate.

Development 
Hey! Pikmin was developed by Arzest and produced by Takashi Tezuka and Naoto Ohshima, Arzest's founder. On November 6, 2014, Shigeru Miyamoto stated during a Q&A of his recently released Pikmin short films that "Continually launching campaigns after the release of software will lay the groundwork for the next iteration of Pikmin in the future. And needless to say, we want it to be one of the motivations for potential consumers to purchase a Wii U. We are making a variety of different efforts."

Later, on January 6, 2015, Miyamoto gave further confirmation that the Pikmin franchise would be receiving more games in the future, stating "I still have a lot of ideas about what I want to do with Pikmin, but nothing's decided yet in terms of anything else. But of course, we will continue to make Pikmin games."

Furthermore, on September 7, 2015, Miyamoto confirmed in an interview with Eurogamer that the next Pikmin game was in development, and was "very close to completion." During E3 2016, Miyamoto gave further updates, stating "Yes, you are right, and we're working on [the next Pikmin]. So, you know, when we're in development we have to create a list of priorities and it has been hard to kind of fit that into that list, but we're hopefully starting to see that on the list now.".

Reception 

The game received "mixed" reviews, according to review aggregator Metacritic. The game was criticized for its simple puzzles and lack of depth. Game Informer stated: "Puzzles are also extremely simple, and usually boil down to tossing Pikmin around obstacles... Nintendo's low-impact blend of strategy and action flounders between relaxing and boring." Areas praised in the game include the amiibo functions. Allegra Frank of Polygon said "Hey! Pikmin might not be the most exciting Nintendo 3DS game out right now — hats off to Miitopia — but its amiibo functionality is the most charming we’ve seen in a long, long time."

References

External links 
 

2017 video games
Pikmin
Action video games
Nintendo Network games
Nintendo 3DS games
Nintendo 3DS-only games
Nintendo 3DS eShop games
Single-player video games
Video games developed in Japan
Video games produced by Takashi Tezuka
Video games scored by Masato Kouda
Video games set on fictional planets
Video games that use Amiibo figurines
Arzest games